Dejan Peševski (born 5 August 1993) is a Macedonian football midfielder.

Club career
He made his professional debut for Ružomberok senior side on 3 April 2013 in the Corgoň Liga match against Nitra, entering in as a substitute in place of Lukáš Lupták.

International career
He made his senior debut for Macedonia in a May 2016 friendly match against Azerbaijan and has earned a total of 2 caps, scoring no goals. His second and final international was a June 2016 friendly against Iran.

External links
 

MFK Ružomberok profile
Corgoň Liga profile

References

1993 births
Living people
People from Kriva Palanka
Association football midfielders
Macedonian footballers
Slovak footballers
Naturalized citizens of Slovakia
North Macedonia under-21 international footballers
North Macedonia international footballers
MFK Ružomberok players
FC Spartak Trnava players
FK Železiarne Podbrezová players
FC Koper players
FK Dukla Banská Bystrica players
ŠKF Sereď players
TJ Sklotatran Poltár players
Slovak Super Liga players
2. Liga (Slovakia) players
Slovenian PrvaLiga players
3. Liga (Slovakia) players
Macedonian expatriate footballers
Expatriate footballers in Slovakia
Macedonian expatriate sportspeople in Slovakia
Expatriate footballers in Slovenia
Macedonian expatriate sportspeople in Slovenia